Edwin A. Quick (1841-1913) was an American architect practicing in Yonkers, New York, directly north of New York City.

Life and career
Edwin Quick was born in 1841 in Rhinebeck, New York, where he attended the Rhinebeck Academy. He studied architecture, and worked as a construction superintendent in New York in the 1860s and 1870s, working for Gilman & Kendall, J. William Schickel, and Renwick & Sands. He moved to Yonkers in April, 1874. He was practicing independently as an architect by 1882. Circa 1891 he made his son, H. Lansing Quick, a partner in the firm, which became Edwin A. Quick & Son. The two practiced together until 1913, upon the elder Quick's death.

Quick died on October 19, 1913, at his home in Yonkers.

Architectural works

E. A. Quick, before 1891
 1887 - Messiah Baptist Church, 76 Warburton Ave, Yonkers, New York
 1889 - Colgate Library (Former), Colgate University, Hamilton, New York
 1890 - Dayspring Presbyterian Church, 320 Walnut St, Yonkers, New York
 Destroyed.
 1891 - Leslie M. Saunders House (Greystone), 1 Greystone Ter, Yonkers, New York

E. A. Quick & Son, 1891-1913
 1891 - Macedonia Baptist Church, 243 Pershing Dr, Ansonia, Connecticut
 1891 - Nodine Hill Water Tower, Elm St, Yonkers, New York
 Collapsed in 1937.
 1893 - Westchester County Hall of Records, 166 Main St, White Plains, New York
 Demolished.
 1894 - Yonkers City Hospital, 1 Ridge Hill Blvd, Yonkers, New York
 Demolished.
 1896 - Citizens' National Bank Building, 6 S Broadway, Yonkers, New York
 Demolished.
 1896 - McCann Building, 25 N Broadway, Yonkers, New York
 1899 - Merrill (President's) House, Colgate University, Hamilton, New York
 1900 - Hamilton High School, 35 Broad St, Hamilton, New York
 Demolished.
 1900 - Anna J. Ivers Apartments, 37 Oak St, Yonkers, New York
 1900 - New York Telephone Co. Exchange Building, 47 S 6th Ave, Mount Vernon, New York
 1901 - Dayspring Presbyterian Church, 320 Walnut St, Yonkers, New York
 1901 - Henry R. Hicks House, 303 S Broadway, Yonkers, New York
 Demolished.
 1901 - Oak Street Firehouse, 81 Oak St, Yonkers, New York
 1903 - Yonkers Public Library, 70 S Broadway, Yonkers, New York
 Demolished in 1982.
 1908 - Yonkers City Hall, 40 S Broadway, Yonkers, New York
 1912 - Hamilton Theatre, 9 Main St, Yonkers, New York
 Demolished in 1927.

References

1841 births
1913 deaths
19th-century American architects
Architects from New York (state)